Roslyn is a station on the Long Island Rail Road's Oyster Bay Branch. It is located at Lincoln Avenue and Railroad Avenue, west of Roslyn Road in Roslyn Heights, New York.

History

Roslyn station opened on January 23, 1865 by the Glen Cove Branch Rail Road, a Long Island Rail Road subsidiary.  

In 1882, the LIRR attempted to extend the former Flushing and North Side Railroad main line between the Great Neck and Roslyn stations. This proposal dates back to an F&NS subsidiary, called the "Roslyn and Huntington Railroad", ultimately failed, and that line was instead extended to Port Washington in 1898. In the meantime, Roslyn station was moved in 1885, in order to accommodate a new freight station, and the station was rebuilt between June and July 1887.  

In the early 20th century, the New York & North Shore Traction Company's Port Washington Line stopped at and served the station; the n23 bus follows much this former trolley line's route.

The station house was restored to its 19th-century origins in 1981.  

In 1988, Roslyn Station was moved to the south side of Lincoln Avenue; this project saw the moving of the historic station house to this new location, where it stands today.

Station layout
The Roslyn LIRR station has two high-level side platforms, each being long enough to accommodate four train cars.

Parking 
Free parking is available on the west side of the station. The lot is operated and maintained by the Town of North Hempstead.

References

External links

Unofficial LIRR History Website(June 2006 Photos):
Original pot-bellied stove and Modern electronic destination sign
Ticket Vendors beneath Overhangs and View from Parking Lot
Views of Pedestrian Bridge and from the Pedestrian Bridge
Early 20th Century Postcard (TrainsAreFun.com)
Platforms from Google Maps Street View
Station House (Interior) from Google Maps Street View

Long Island Rail Road stations in Nassau County, New York
Railway stations in the United States opened in 1865
1865 establishments in New York (state)